Great Britain, represented by the British Olympic Association (BOA), competed at the 1992 Summer Olympics in Barcelona, Spain. British athletes have competed in every Summer Olympic Games. A total of 371 athletes represented Great Britain and the team won twenty medals, five gold, three silver and twelve bronze. This equalled the number of golds won at the previous three Summer Games but was the lowest total medals achieved since the Montreal Games in 1976. Archer Simon Terry and hurdlers Sally Gunnell and Kriss Akabusi each won two medals.


Medallists

The following British athletes won medals at the Games. In the 'by discipline' sections below, medallists' names are emboldened.

Competitors
The following is the list of number of competitors in the Games.

Archery

In the sixth appearance by Great Britain in modern Olympic archery, the men's team won a bronze medal and Simon Terry added another individual bronze. Alison Williamson added another top eight finish.

Men

Women

Athletics

Men

Track

Field

Combined

Women

Track

Field

Combined

Badminton

Men

Women

Boxing

Great Britain's sent 10 boxers to the Games. The squad included Adrian Dodson who had previously competed for Guyana at the 1988 Games under the name Adrian Carew. Four British boxers were knocked out in the first round of competition, two were knocked out in the second round and three lost in the quarter finals. Robin Reid, a 21-year-old bookmaker's cashier nicknamed 'The Grim Reaper', won the only medal, a bronze in the light middleweight division after he was beaten in the semi-final by Orhan Delibaş.

Key:
KO-x = Knock-out-in round x
PTS = Overall jury points
RSC = Referee stopped contest
RSCH = Referee stopped contest due to head injury

Canoeing

Slalom

Sprint

Cycling

Sixteen cyclists, thirteen men and three women, represented Great Britain in 1992. Chris Boardman won gold in the individual pursuit.

Road

Men

Women

Track

Diving

Four British divers competed at the Games; Naomi Bishop in the women's 3 m individual springboard; Hayley Allen and Lesley Ward in the women's 10 m platform; and Robert 'Bob' Morgan in both the men's 3 m individual springboard and 10 m platform. Morgan achieved the squad's best result finishing 5th in the 10 m platform, an event in which he had won the European bronze medal in 1991 and gold at the 1990 Commonwealth Games.

Men

Women

Equestrian

Dressage

Eventing

Jumping

Fencing

15 fencers, 10 men and 5 women represented Great Britain in 1992.

Men

Women

Gymnastics

Artistic 

Men

Women

Rhythmic 

The women's individual all-around was the only rhythmic gymnastics event at the 1992 Olympics. Britain entered two athletes neither of whom made the final.

Hockey

Men

Manager: Bernie Cotton

Women

Head coach: Dennis Hay

Judo

Britain sent 14 judokas to Barcelona, seven men and seven women.

Men

Women

Modern pentathlon 

Three modern pentathletes represented Britain at the Games, all were men and contested both the individual and team events. Women's events in the sport were not introduced to the Olympics until Sydney in 2000.

Rowing

Men

Women

Sailing

Shooting

Swimming

Men's 50 m freestyle
 Mark Foster
 Heat – 22.72
 Final – 22.52 (→ 6th place)

 Mike Fibbens
 Heat – 23.27 (→ did not advance, 19th place)

Men's 100 m freestyle
 Mike Fibbens
 Heat – 50.93 (→ did not advance, 21st place)

 Paul Howe
 Heat – 51.12 (→ did not advance, 24th place)

Men's 200 m freestyle
 Paul Palmer
 Heat – 1:49.21
 B-Final – 1:48.92 (→ 9th place)

 Paul Howe
 Heat – 1:49.86
 B-Final – 1:50.15 (→ 13th place)

Men's 400 m freestyle
 Paul Palmer
 Heat – 3:51.93
 B-Final – 3:51.60 (→ 10th place)

 Stephen Akers
 Heat – 3:58.99 (→ did not advance, 28th place)

Men's 1500 m freestyle
 Ian Wilson
 Heat – 15:15.37
 Final – 15:13.35 (→ 5th place)

 Stephen Akers
 Heat – 15:46.48 (→ did not advance, 19th place)

Men's 100 m backstroke
 Martin Harris
 Heat – 57.57 (→ did not advance, 24th place)

 Adam Ruckwood
 Heat – 57.75 (→ did not advance, 30th place)

Men's 200 m backstroke
 Adam Ruckwood
 Heat – 2:03.54 (→ did not advance, 24th place)

 Matthew O'Connor
 Heat – 2:05.94 (→ did not advance, 32nd place)

Men's 100 m breaststroke
 Nick Gillingham
 Heat – 1:01.81
 Final – 1:02.32 (→ 7th place)

 Adrian Moorhouse
 Heat – 1:02.09
 Final – 1:02.33 (→ 8th place)

Men's 200 m breaststroke
 Nick Gillingham
 Heat – 2:13.42
 Final – 2:11.29 (→  Bronze Medal)

 Jason Hender
 Heat – 2:23.10 (→ did not advance, 35th place)

Men's 100 m butterfly
 Richard Leishman
 Heat – 54.96 (→ did not advance, 19th place)

 Simon Wainwright
 Heat – 56.53 (→ did not advance, 41st place)

Men's 200 m butterfly
 Simon Wainwright
 Heat – 2:01.53 (→ did not advance, 22nd place)

Men's 200 m individual medley
 John Davey
 Heat – 2:05.07 (→ did not advance, 18th place)

 Andy Rolley
 Heat – 2:09.22 (→ did not advance, 36th place)

Men's 400 m individual medley
 Andy Rolley
 Heat – 4:32.82 (→ did not advance, 25th place)

Men's 4 × 100 m freestyle relay 
 Mike Fibbens, Mark Foster, Paul Howe, and Roland Lee
 Heat – 3:21.41
 Final – 3:21.75 (→ 7th place)

Men's 4 × 200 m freestyle relay 
 Paul Palmer, Steven Mellor, Stephen Akers, and Paul Howe
 Heat – 7:23.10
 Paul Palmer, Paul Howe, Stephen Akers, and Steven Mellor
 Final – 7:22.57 (→ 6th place)

Men's 4 × 100 m medley relay 
 Martin Harris, Nick Gillingham, Richard Leishman, and Roland Lee
 Heat – 3:43.96 (→ did not advance, 9th place)

Women's 50 m freestyle
 Karen Pickering
 Heat – 26.78 (→ did not advance, 24th place)

 Alison Sheppard
 Heat – 26.90 (→ did not advance, 27th place)

Women's 100 m freestyle
 Karen Pickering
 Heat – 57.17 (→ did not advance, 17th place)

 Alison Sheppard
 Heat – 58.83 (→ did not advance, 31st place)

Women's 200 m freestyle
 Karen Pickering
 Heat – 2:01.09
 B-Final – 2:00.33 (→ 10th place)

Women's 400 m freestyle
 Samantha Foggo
 Heat – 4:22.26 (→ did not advance, 19th place)

 Elizabeth Arnold
 Heat – 4:25.55 (→ did not advance, 25th place)

Women's 800 m freestyle
 Samantha Foggo
 Heat – 8:50.17 (→ did not advance, 13th place)

 Elizabeth Arnold
 Heat – 8:56.04 (→ did not advance, 17th place)

Women's 100 m backstroke
 Joanne Deakins
 Heat – 1:04.38 (→ did not advance, 19th place)

 Kathy Read
 Heat – 1:04.97 (→ did not advance, 24th place)

Women's 200 m backstroke
 Joanne Deakins
 Heat – 2:14.34
 B-Final – 2:13.91 (→ 10th place)

 Kathy Read
 Heat – 2:17.15 (→ did not advance, 21st place)

Women's 100 m breaststroke
 Susannah Brownsdon
 Heat – 1:13.24 (→ did not advance, 23rd place)

 Jaime King
 Heat – 1:13.32 (→ did not advance, 24th place)

Women's 200 m breaststroke
 Susannah Brownsdon
 Heat – 2:35.28 (→ did not advance, 21st place)

 Jaime King
 Heat – 2:44.49 (→ did not advance, 33rd place)

Women's 100 m butterfly
 Madelaine Campbell
 Heat – 1:02.43 (→ did not advance, 20th place)

 Samantha Purvis
 Heat – 1:02.94 (→ did not advance, 28th place)

Women's 200 m butterfly
 Samantha Purvis
 Heat – 2:15.04
 B-Final – 2:14.47 (→ 13th place)

 Helen Slatter
 Heat – 2:20.45 (→ did not advance, 24th place)

Women's 200 m individual medley
 Sharron Davies
 Heat – 2:19.41 (→ did not advance, 21st place)

 Helen Slatter
 Heat – 2:22.04 (→ did not advance, 26th place)

Women's 400 m individual medley
 Sharron Davies
 Heat – 4:56.44 (→ did not advance, 21st place)

 Helen Slatter
 Heat – 4:58.24 (→ did not advance, 23rd place)

Women's 4 × 100 m medley relay
 Joanne Deakins, Susannah Brownsdon, Madelaine Campbell, and Karen Pickering
 Heat – 4:16.51 (→ did not advance, 10th place)

Synchronized swimming

Three synchronised swimmers represented Great Britain in 1992.

Table tennis

Tennis

Great Britain sent six tennis players, two men and four women, to Barcelona. Five competed in singles events, four of whom were knocked out in the first round. The only player to advance to the second round of the singles was Samantha Smith. Smith beat compatriot Sara Gomer in the first round before losing to Natasha Zvereva, who was representing the Unified team. Smith also took part in the women's doubles alongside Clare Wood, the pair lost in the first round to Italians Laura Garrone and Raffaella Reggi. In the men's doubles Andrew Castle and Chris Wilkinson lost their first round tie to the seventh seeds, and eventual bronze medallists, Javier Frana and Christian Miniussi of Argentina.

Men

Women

Weightlifting

Six British weightlifters took part in the Games. Peter Morgan achieved the best result, a seventh-place finish in the middle-heavyweight division. Dave Morgan, who had finished fourth at the 1984 and 1988 Games, was 15th in the light-heavyweight event.

Wrestling

Britain entered a single wrestler, Calum McNeil in the men's lightweight freestyle.

See also
 Great Britain at the Olympics
 Great Britain at the 1992 Summer Paralympics
 1992 Summer Olympics medal table
 List of 1992 Summer Olympics medal winners

References

External links
Official Olympic Reports

Nations at the 1992 Summer Olympics
1992
Summer Olympics